Ischnocodia is a genus of beetles belonging to the family Chrysomelidae.

The species of this genus are found in Southern America.

Species:

Ischnocodia annulus 
Ischnocodia succincta

References

Cassidinae
Chrysomelidae genera